Hersilia is a woman that features prominently in myths related to the creation of Rome.

Animals
 Hersilia (spider), a genus of the spider family Hersiliidae
 Hersilia (fly), a genus of the fly family Tachinidae

Vessels
 , an American merchant vessel destroyed off the coast of Chile